The Journal of Social and Clinical Psychology is a bimonthly peer-reviewed scientific journal covering social and clinical psychology. It was established in 1983 by John Harvey and is published by Guilford Press. The editor-in-chief is Thomas Joiner (Florida State University). According to the Journal Citation Reports, the journal has a 2020 impact factor of 1.946.

References

External links

Publications established in 1983
Bimonthly journals
Social psychology journals
Clinical psychology journals
English-language journals
Guilford Press academic journals